Polyclysta is a genus of moths in the family Geometridae.

The moth has grey/brown wings each with several dark zigzag transverse lines, and several darker patches. The wingspan is about 1.5 cm.

References

Geometridae